Evan Edinger (born July 29, 1990) is an American-British YouTuber based in London, England.

Edinger is known for his "British VS American" series in which he compares topics such as exams, healthcare systems, and taxes with guest YouTubers from the United Kingdom.

Early life and education
Edinger attended Woodstown High School in Salem County, New Jersey from 2006 to 2008. He then received an Associate of Arts degree in mathematics at Salem Community College in Carneys Point Township, New Jersey, where he graduated in 2010.

Edinger received a Bachelor of Arts in mathematics, statistics, and operation research from Rowan University in Glassboro, New Jersey. He began posting YouTube videos in 2010 while still in college. Edinger was largely inspired by the work of Charlie McDonnell and Ray William Johnson. He originally used the pseudonym "naveregnide", his name spelled backwards, before changing it to his full name.

In 2012, Edinger moved to London to pursue a Master of Science at Cass Business School. After finishing his degree, Edinger remained there to work full-time.

Career
Over his time as a YouTuber, Edinger has collaborated with Dodie Clark, Connie Glynn, Jay Foreman, and others. For a time, Edinger and Clark shared an apartment He has amassed 716,000 subscribers on his main channel and 132,000 on his travel channel and has posted over 700 videos across both channels.

Personal life
Edinger identifies as asexual and near demisexual. On June 13, 2021, Edinger announced he had received British citizenship.

References

External links
Evan Edinger at YouTube

1990 births
Living people
American emigrants to the United Kingdom
American YouTubers
Asexual men
Demisexual people
Naturalised citizens of the United Kingdom
People from Deptford Township, New Jersey
Rowan University alumni
Woodstown High School alumni
YouTube channels launched in 2006